Helen Giri Syiem is an Indian musicologist and historian, known for her efforts in promoting Khasi music tradition. A former member of faculty at the North Eastern Hill University, she is a member of the executive council of the Sangeet Natak Akademi.

Biography
She is known to have contributed in the restoration of traditional Khasi musical instruments and has instituted a scholarship fund at the Martin Luther Christian University, Shillong for the promotion of Khasi music.

She assisted in the establishment of 35 traditional music institutes and has organized music festivals, besides working for the rehabilitation of physically challenged children.

Her book, Khasi Under British Rule, 1824-1947, is a historical narrative of Khasi life during the pre-independence period.

The Government of India awarded her the fourth highest civilian honour of the Padma Shri in 2008, for her contributions to Khasi music.

See also 
 Khasi people

References

Further reading 
 

Recipients of the Padma Shri in arts
Year of birth missing (living people)
20th-century Indian historians
Khasi people
Indian women musicologists
Indian musicologists
Writers from Meghalaya
Academic staff of the North-Eastern Hill University
Living people
Scholars from Meghalaya
Indian women science writers
Indian social sciences writers
Indian women historians
20th-century Indian educational theorists
20th-century Indian women scientists
Women writers from Meghalaya
Women scientists from Meghalaya
Educators from Meghalaya
Women educators from Meghalaya
20th-century women writers
20th-century women educators